Tarif al-Matghari (b. ? -744) was the founder of the Berber Barghawata dynasty in the Tamesna region in Morocco. He was the father of the self-proclaimed prophet and king Salih ibn Tarif. It is believed that he was born in the area of Barbate, near Cádiz in Spain.

References and notes

8th-century Berber people
Berber Moroccans
744 deaths
8th-century African people
Year of birth unknown

Berber rulers